Origins of the Fifth Amendment:  The Right Against Self-Incrimination by American historian Leonard W. Levy (Oxford University Press, 1968) won the 1969 Pulitzer Prize for History. It followed in the wake of the 1966 United States Supreme Court Opinion Miranda v. Arizona. The book was reissued in 1986 and 1999. Origins probes the intentions of the framers of the Fifth Amendment and emphasizes their belief that in a society based upon respect for the individual, it is more important that the accused not unwillingly contribute to his conviction than that the guilty be punished.

References

Pulitzer Prize for History-winning works
Fifth Amendment to the United States Constitution
Books about United States legal history
Oxford University Press books